Joachim Franke (born 30 March 1940 in Weißwasser) is a German ice hockey player, who competed for SG Dynamo Weißwasser. He won the bronze medal with the East Germany national ice hockey team at the 1966 European Championships.

Franke played a total of 40 games for East Germany at the World Championships between 1959 and 1967, recording eight goals and two assists.

References

External links
 "Die Welt" Newspaper

1940 births
Living people
German ice hockey players
People from Görlitz (district)
Sportspeople from Saxony